Clear Creek is a creek in Utah which joins the Sevier River near the city of Sevier. It flows alongside Interstate 70 just east of where I-70 meets I-15.

It is best known for its Fremont culture Native American archaeological finds and Fremont Indian State Park, which celebrates these finds.

See also
List of rivers of Utah

External links
Utah State Park site with map

Clear Creek
Fremont culture
Rivers of Sevier County, Utah